Anbe Vaa may refer to:
 Anbe Vaa (1966 film), an Indian Tamil-language film
 Anbe Vaa (2005 film), an Indian Tamil-language film
 Anbe Vaa (2009 TV series), an Indian Tamil-language soap opera
 Anbe Vaa (2020 TV series), an Indian Tamil-language soap opera